Jess Phillips (born 1981) is a British politician and Member of Parliament for Birmingham Yardley.

Jess Phillips or Jessica Phillips may also refer to:

 Jess Phillips (American football) (born 1947), American former football player
 Jessica Phillips (cyclist) (born 1978), American cyclist
 Jessica Phillips (actress) (born 1971), American musical actress and singer

See also
 Jesse Phillips (canoeist) (born 1986), Australian sprint canoeist
 Jesse J. Phillips (1837–1901), American jurist and military officer